The Marine Cemetery is an art installation located at Beypore beach in Kozhikode, Kerala, India dedicated to nine endangered marine and riverine species. It is made up of 2,000 plastic bottles that had been previously collected from the beach. It was opened in 2019.

History
The Marine Cemetery is dedicated to marine and riverine species which are endangered due to plastic waste, water pollution, climate change, and overexploitation. The installation is an awareness initiative.

The monument was made by Climate Activist Aakash Ranison & initiated by Jellyfish Watersports in collaboration with the Beypore Port administration, the authorities of Kozhikode district, and under the Clean Beach Mission of the Ministry of Environment, Forest and Climate Change. It was opened on 4 December 2019, the World Wildlife Conservation Day, by S. Sambasiva Rao, District Collector of Kozhikode, and V. K. C. Mammed Koya, MLA for Beypore constituency.

Installation

The installation has nine markers, each dedicated to an endangered marine and riverine species, built with plastic bottles encased in gravestone-shaped iron frames.

See also
 Single Use Plastic Deathbed

References

Climate change in art
Monuments and memorials in Kerala
2019 establishments in Kerala
Kozhikode